Qayyūm al-asmā or Qayyúmu'l-Asmá' (Arabic: قيوم الأسماء; transl. "The Self-Subsisting Lord of All Names") is the first long work of  Siyyid ʻAlí Muhammad Shírází (Arabic: سيد علي محمد شيرازي), the Báb after his declaration. Also known as the Tafsir Surat Yusuf (Commentary on the Surah of Joseph), this is an essay that was written as a commentary to Surah 12 in the Qurʼan: Surat Yusuf (سورة يوسف). This composition is similar in its structure to the Qurʼan itself: it contains 111 chapters (Surahs), each of which contains 42 verses.

Name
In the standard English transliteration, the name of the essay is "Qayyūm al-asmā'''". Its meaning in Arabic is "the maintainer of the names". The names here refer to the 99 names of God in Islam. "Existence" (qayyum) is the name numbered 63. The book is sometimes called the Surat Yusuf (Surah interpretation of Joseph), or Ahsan al-Qisas (Arabic: best story of all stories), meaning the best story. "Ahsan al-Qisas"  is a well-known name for Surat Yusuf in general and not necessarily related to the interpretation of the Báb in particular.

HistoryQayyūm al-asmā is considered to be the first long book written by the Báb after the commencement of his mission. On May 22, 1844, the Báb proclaimed himself as a divine revelation and emissary, and as the Báb, or the Mahdi or the messiah whom the Shiites are waiting to return at the end of days to fill the earth with justice after its being filled with oppression, and he who signifies the eschatological age and the end of human history. In Kitáb-i-Íqán (Arabic: The Book of Certitude), Baháʼu'lláh, the founder of the Baháʼí Faith, which developed from the Bábi doctrines, calls the Qayyūm al-asmā "the first, the greatest and mightiest of all books". According to evidence, the first surah of the book, called Surat al-Muluk (Arabic: Surah al-Maluk) (Surah of the Kings) was written in the presence of Mullah Hussein Bushru'i on the evening of May 22, 1844.

According to the claims of Bábi believers, the writing the book — hundreds of pages long — was relatively quick. It is described in their writings that the Báb wrote the entire book in 40 days, in a kind of ecstasy of divine inspiration. However, academic sources disagree: some believe that the number forty is typological only and does not necessarily indicate a period of exactly forty days, but that his writing took several months. Qayyūm al-asmā was the central book of the Bábi faith in its first year. Preachers of the Bábi faith, like Mullah Hussein Bushru'i, took copies of the essay and distributed it outside of Shiraz.

Structure and content
The composition consists of 111 Surahs, similar to the number of verses in the Quranic Surat Yusuf. At the top of each sura appears the basmalah (in Arabic: البسملة), meaning the Muslim saying, Bismillah al-raḥman al-raḥim ("In the Name of God, the Merciful, the Compassionate"), which appears at the top of every sura in the Quran, with the exception of the ninth surah. The appearance of this formula, unique to the structure of the Quran, adds to the connection that the author sought to create between the existence of al-Asma and the holy book of Islam. Additionally, one can discern another Quranic characteristic in al-Asma — at the beginning of the Surahs there appear mysterious separate letters, similar to those in the Quran.

This composition is different from any regular interpretation of Surat Yusuf: much of the book deals with the religious and messianic doctrines of the Báb, with only a slight connection to the Quranic Surah. There are almost no elements in the composition that mention the interpretation of a typical Quran, but it is a kind of new composition that stands by itself. In the few times that the Báb writes an interpretation of a particular Quaranic verse, this interpretation is in the form of an allegorical and esoteric interpretation — Tawil (Arabic: تأويل) and not a Tafsir (Arabic: تفسير).

The method of interpretation in the book is allegorical-esoteric and mystical: (Arabic: تأويل) a commentary which is actually a revelation. In this work, the interpretation of the Quran becomes a divine revelation, and revelation is used as a tool for interpretation. The entire composition is inspired by the model of the Quranic style, with a considerable amount of Quranic terminology. For example, in Sura 4 verse 13 in the Qayyūm al-asmā, the Báb writes: "We [the Hidden Imam] have brought down this book about our servant and our servant [the ba'b] [by virtue of] a divine permit [in a form that] resembles [the Quran] In the first Surah of the Book, the Hidden Imam says: "We have revealed to you [to the Báb] all that God has revealed to us [the imams]." Here the Báb is depicted as a mediator between the Hidden Imam and humanity.

Along with these 'moderate' statements, one can find in the book 'bold' statements that describe this book as a new revelation from God, that is, as the new Quran. These statements bring the status of the Báb closer to that of a prophet. Elsewhere in the book one can find verses that proclaim the Báb as a divine manifestation of himself, i.e., as the Manifestation of God on earth: "Indeed I am God, and there is no god but me" (Al-Asmaa, Sura 22, 21).

References

Further reading
 Balyuzi, H. M. (1973). The Bab: The Herald of the Day of Days. George Ronald: Oxford.

 Taherzadeh, Habib (tr; 1978). Selections from the Writings of the Báb. Bahá'í World Centre: Haifa.

External links
Translations of Surahs of the Qayyūm al-asmā, of the Sayyid ʻAlī Muhammad,  the Bāb  (1819-1850), by Stephen N.  Lambden
The Quran Commentary of Sayyid Alí Muhammad, the Báb: Doctoral dissertation, by Todd Lawson
Qayyúm-al-'Asmá: Notes on Joseph, by Brent Poirier and Stephen LambdenQayyum al-Asma' Sura 93: Chapter of the Bees: A commentary on the Sura of Joseph, "The Best of Stories",  by The Báb, translated by Todd Lawson. originally written as "Qayyum al-Asma 93: Surat al-nahl".
Coincidentia Oppositorum in the Qayyum al-Asma: The terms "Point" (nuqta), "Pole" (qutb), "Center" (markaz) and the   Khutbat al-tatanjiya, by Todd Lawson
Interpretation as Revelation: The Qurʼán Commentary of the Báb, by Todd Lawson
Joycean Modernism in a Nineteenth-Century Qurʼan Commentary? - A Comparison of the Bab's Qayyūm al asmāʼ with Joyce's Ulysses, by Todd Lawson

Bábism
Bábí texts